James Millard Hayes (February 11, 1913 – November 27, 1993), nicknamed "Whitey", was a pitcher in Major League Baseball. He played for the Washington Senators.

References

External links

1913 births
1993 deaths
Major League Baseball pitchers
Washington Senators (1901–1960) players
Baseball players from Alabama
People from Montevallo, Alabama